Felix Mizell Wilson (November 24, 1897 – July 18, 1968) was a lieutenant and lawyer, the son of Felix Zollicoffer Wilson. He was once a college football player for coach Dan McGugin's Vanderbilt Commodores football teams. Wilson worked with the New York law firm of Milbank, Tweed, Hope & Hadle.

References

1897 births
1968 deaths
American football guards
Vanderbilt Commodores football players
People from Nashville, Tennessee
People from White Plains, New York
20th-century American lawyers